Tarbor-e Jafari (also Romanized as Tarbor-e Ja‘farī; also known as Tarbor-e Bālā) is a village in Darian Rural District, in the Central District of Shiraz County, Fars Province, Iran. At the 2006 census, its population was 1,989, in 499 families.

References 

Populated places in Shiraz County